The Buffalo History Museum (founded as the Buffalo Historical Society, and later named the Buffalo and Erie County Historical Society) is located at 1 Museum Court (formerly 25 Nottingham Court) in Buffalo, New York, just east of Elmwood Avenue and off of Nottingham Terrace, north of the Scajaquada Expressway, in the northwest corner of Delaware Park.

History

The building that houses the Buffalo History Museum was constructed in 1901 as the New York State pavilion for that year's Pan-American Exposition, and is the sole surviving permanent structure from the exposition.  As planned, the Buffalo Historical Society moved into the building after the exposition.

Designed by Buffalo architect George Cary (1859–1945), its south portico is meant to evoke the Parthenon in Athens. The building was designated a National Historic Landmark in 1987.

Founded in 1862, the Buffalo Historical Society's first president was Millard Fillmore.  Its exhibits, programs, and events are attended by schoolchildren, families, and students.  It has hosted observances of Lincoln's Birthday for over a century.

From 1879 to 1947, the Society published pioneering scholarship on the people, events, and history of the Niagara Frontier.  Many of those volumes are now online in full text.

In 1960, the Buffalo Historical Society changed its name to the Buffalo and Erie County Historical Society, and on October 25, 2012, the Buffalo and Erie County Historical Society announced it was rebranding itself as The Buffalo History Museum.

Exhibits 
All three floors of the building offer exhibits, including the Rotary Gallery (featuring elaborate model trains), the Pioneer Gallery, the Erie County Room, the State Court, the Community Gallery, Native American Gallery, Neighbors, and ICONS.  A recreation of Tim Russert's office opened in October 2014 after having been installed at the Newseum in Washington, D.C.  On view by appointment in the Museum's Resource Center on Forest Avenue is the gun used by Leon F. Czolgosz to shoot President William McKinley at the Exposition's Temple of Music on September 6, 1901.

In November 2017, the Buffalo History Museum opened the Icons: The Makers and Moments of Buffalo Sports exhibit. The new exhibit explores Buffalo New York's rich sports history and investigates the unique connection between fans and the beloved teams and sports idols of the area. Highlights include Ralph Wilson's hall of fame jacket, the only helmet Scott Norwood ever wore during his career as a Buffalo Bill, and a changing exhibit currently featuring the Buffalo Beauts.

Research Library 
Of particular interest to historians, genealogists, researchers, and house history buffs are the collections of the Research Library.  Notable collections include:

The Millard Fillmore Papers
The Peter Buell Porter Papers
The Mary Burnett Talbert papers 
The Larkin Company records and memorabilia
The Pan-American Exposition collection
Maris B. Pierce's papers

Additional resources include:

100,000 artifacts
20,000 books
200,000 photographs
50,000 plans
Drawings
Maps
Posters
Prints
Broadsides
6,500 microfilms of newspapers
Church records
Cemetery records
Censuses
Pamphlets
Clippings

In addition there is similar ephemera that documents the people, places, architecture, organizations, businesses, and events in the Buffalo and Niagara frontier region.  A number of detailed bibliographies on popular topics are online at WorldCat.

FRANK, the library's growing catalog of 25,000 books and manuscripts, is freely searchable online.

Same-sex wedding memorabilia
In 2011, after the passage of equal marriage in the State of New York, the Research Library became the first known library in the United States to collect wedding memorabilia from legally wed same-sex couples.

Amateis pediment
The left, center, and right sections of the pediment atop the Museum, designed by Edmond Amateis and includes clothed, semi-nude and nude figures.

References

External links 

 
 History Buffs: The YouTube channel of The Buffalo History Museum
 Encyclopedia Americana entry, vol. 3, 1903
 Buffalo Historical Society, 1930: A short pamphlet illustrated with photographs of museum interiors & exhibits, published to commemorate the expansion of the original 1901 building.
 Buffalo Historical Society Publications: A list of essays, pamphlets, annual reports, and scholarship, with links to online editions

National Historic Landmarks in New York (state)
Museums on the National Register of Historic Places in New York (state)
Infrastructure completed in 1901
Historical societies in New York (state)
Museums in Buffalo, New York
Architecture of Buffalo, New York
Historical society museums in New York (state)
World's fair architecture in New York (state)
Institutions accredited by the American Alliance of Museums
Photo archives in the United States
National Register of Historic Places in Buffalo, New York
1901 establishments in New York (state)
Research libraries in the United States
Pan-American Exposition